Salaheddine Aqqal (born 22 August 1984) is a retired Moroccan football midfielder. 

Aqqal played for the Moroccan team in the Under-20 African Nations Cup in 2003.  In 2004, he was playing for Olympic Club de Khouribga (OCK). He was part of the Moroccan 2004 Olympic football team, who exited in the first round, finishing third in group D, behind group winners Iraq and runners-up Costa Rica. In 2005, he captained the Moroccan team at the Mediterranean Games in Almería.

External links
BBC article on African Nations Cup 2003

1984 births
Living people
Moroccan footballers
Morocco international footballers
Olympic footballers of Morocco
Footballers at the 2004 Summer Olympics
Ettifaq FC players
Al-Tai FC players
Al-Taawoun FC players
Raja CA players
People from Khouribga
Al-Raed FC players
Al-Hazem F.C. players
AS FAR (football) players
Moroccan expatriate footballers
Moroccan expatriate sportspeople in Saudi Arabia
Olympique Club de Khouribga players
Association football midfielders